The Journal of Mammalogy is a bimonthly peer-reviewed scientific journal published by Oxford University Press on behalf of the American Society of Mammalogists. Both the society and the journal were established in 1919. The journal covers research on mammals throughout the world, including their ecology, genetics, conservation, behavior, systematics, morphology, and physiology. The journal also publishes news about the society and advertises student scholarship opportunities.

See also
 Barbara Hibbs Blake
 Mammalian Species

References

External links
 
 

Academic journals associated with learned and professional societies
Bimonthly journals
English-language journals
Mammalogy journals
Publications established in 1919